The 2012–13 Liga Femenina de Baloncesto was the 50th edition of the Spanish premier women's basketball championship. The regular season started on 12 October 2012 and finished on 30 March 2013. The top six teams played the championship playoffs during April. Eleven teams took part in the regular season championship.

Perfumerías Avenida won its third title after defeating Rivas Ecópolis in the Finals.

Competition format
Top three teams in the standings at mid season and the host team play the Copa de la Reina. If the host team finishes in the top three, the fourth qualified will join the competition.

After the Regular Season, the top six teams play the play-offs. Top two teams qualify directly to semifinals while the teams 3rd–6th begin to play on quarter-finals.

Regular season table

Playoffs

Stats leaders in regular season

Points

Rebounds

Assists

Performance Index Rating

External links
Liga Femenina in FEB.es

Liga Femenina de Baloncesto seasons
Femenina
Spain
Liga